Quo Vadis (or Quo Vadis?) is a 1924 Italian silent historical drama film directed by Gabriellino D'Annunzio and Georg Jacoby and starring Emil Jannings, Elena Sangro, and Lillian Hall-Davis. It is based on the 1896 novel Quo Vadis by Henryk Sienkiewicz which was notably later adapted into a 1951 film.

Plot
In Rome, during the reign of Nero, a young pagan general named Marcus Vinicius falls in love with a beautiful Christian hostage named Licia. Their love appears to be impossible, because of the conflict of their religions. Nero burns the city of Rome and blames the Christians, already hated by the pagan Romans.

Cast

Production
Unione Cinematografica Italiana announced the film in 1921, and began production in 1924. D'Annunzio, the son of the poet Gabriele D'Annunzio, was considered a rising director and also wrote the film's screenplay. It was one of several attempts in early Fascist Italy to recapture the success of the historical epics of the previous decade. Rudolph Valentino was invited to star in the film, but was forced to turn the offer down due to contractual reasons. Production quickly became troubled – the film ran seriously over-budget, and additional financing had to be raised from Germany. The new backers insisted that a German director, Jacoby, be appointed to co-direct.

The film was co-directed by Arturo Ambrosio, Georg Jacoby, and Gabriellino D'Annunzio. Bruno Kastner was initially cast for the film, but withdrew due to an illness causing all of his scenes to be reshot.

Release
The film was distributed by First National Pictures in the United States.

Reception
The film was a critical and commercial failure on its release, effectively ending the career of its producer Arturo Ambrosio, who had been one of the major figures of early Italian cinema. In its review The New York Times described it as "excellent as spectacle, but is too tedious in many sequences to be a good entertainment". D'Annunzio never directed or wrote another film. Jacoby's reputation also suffered heavily, and he switched to working on musicals and comedies. Emil Jannings's performance, on the other hand, received moderate praise. The New Yorker noted that Jannings was the "one item beside boredom" the movie had, but despite his "able performance" they "still prefer him in Germanic studio surroundings".

The French film star Max Linder and his wife watched the film in October 1925. Later, both were found with narcotics overdoses and slit wrists, resulting in their deaths of either a suicide pact or a murder-suicide. The suicide of Petronius and Eunice in the film has been proposed as an inspiration adding to Linder's previous depression.

References

Works cited

External links

 
 
 Quo Vadis at The GreatStars.com; Lost Films Wanted (Wayback Machine) (note: the film survives)
 Still at silenthollywood.com
  [English subtitles]

1924 films
Italian silent feature films
Italian historical drama films
Italian epic films
Films directed by Georg Jacoby
Films directed by Gabriellino D'Annunzio
Films set in Rome
Films based on Polish novels
Films based on works by Henryk Sienkiewicz
Films set in ancient Rome
Films set in the Roman Empire
Films set in the 1st century
Depictions of Nero on film
Cultural depictions of Poppaea Sabina
1920s historical drama films
Italian black-and-white films
1924 drama films
1925 drama films
1925 films
Silent historical drama films
Silent adventure films
1920s Italian films